Everything Is A-OK is the fifth studio album by Australian alternative rock band Violent Soho, released on 3 April 2020 by I Oh You and Pure Noise Records.

Supported by six singles—"A-OK", "Vacation Forever", "Lying on the Floor", "Pick It Up Again", "Canada", and "Slow Down Sonic"—Everything Is A-OK debuted atop the Australian albums chart on 11 April 2020, becoming Violent Soho's second number one album in Australia (following Waco in 2016).

At the 2020 ARIA Music Awards, the album received three nominations—for Best Rock Album, Engineer of the Year (for Greg Wales) and Best Cover Art (for Luke Henery).

Promotion
The band premiered the album through a Q&A livestream on Facebook and YouTube.

Critical reception

Emily Blackburn from The Music felt the album was "musically dynamic" and stated that 
the "Brisbane rock outfit constantly change[s] pace".

Track listing

Personnel
Adapted from the album's liner notes.

Musicians
Violent Soho
 James Tidswell — guitar 
 Michael Richards — drums  
 Luke Boerdam — guitar, vocals 
 Luke Henery — bass

Technical
 Greg Wales — production 
 Will Yip — mixing 
 Ryan Smith —  mastering

Artwork
 Rick Froberg — art
 Ian Laidlaw — photos
 Luke Henery — photos

Charts

Weekly charts

Year-end charts

See also
List of number-one albums of 2020 (Australia)
List of 2020 albums

References

2020 albums
Violent Soho albums